Hu Yixuan (born 23 October 1994) is a Chinese swimmer. He competed in the men's 200 metre individual medley event at the 2016 Summer Olympics.

References

External links
 

1994 births
Living people
Chinese male medley swimmers
Olympic swimmers of China
Swimmers at the 2016 Summer Olympics
Place of birth missing (living people)